Pietro Pennisi (born 11 April 1970) is an Italian former professional tennis player. He is now a lawyer.

Born in Florence, Pennisi is the son of Alessandra Gobbò, a tennis player of the 1960s who won a Universiade gold medal for Italy. His brother Lorenzo was also a tennis player.

Pennisi, a left-handed player, was a doubles runner-up at the 1989 Torneo Internazionali Citta di Firenze. His best performance in singles was a second round appearance at the Bologna Outdoor in 1995.

Grand Prix career finals

Doubles: 1 (0–1)

Challenger titles

Doubles: (2)

References

External links
 
 

1970 births
Living people
Italian male tennis players
Sportspeople from Florence
20th-century Italian people
21st-century Italian people